is a Japanese manga series written and illustrated by Hirohiko Araki, most famous for his manga JoJo's Bizarre Adventure. Originally serialized in Shueisha's shōnen manga magazine Weekly Shōnen Jump from 1984 to 1985, it was later compiled into two tankōbon volumes. The series was adapted into a single-episode original video animation (OVA) by Studio Pierrot and distributed by Toho in 1989.

Baoh is Araki's first series to display his signature amount of over-the-top gore.

Plot
17-year-old Ikuro Hashizawa is kidnapped and turned into a Baoh, a bioweapon with superhuman strength and other abilities, by the Doress Laboratory. He escapes with the help of Sumire, a 9-year-old psychic girl. Professor Kasuminome, head scientist at Doress, sends various assassins and monsters to try and kill Ikuro, in means of stopping the Baoh virus from spreading and infecting the world.

Characters

Main characters

The 17-year-old Ikuro initially knows very little of his past, waking up in the clutches of Doress and accompanying and protecting Sumire. He soon discovers that he has been transformed into a Baoh (standing for Biological Armament On Help), the result of Doress's evolution experimentations to produce a parasitic worm that buries itself into its host brain, slowly transforming it into a nigh-unstoppable killing machine. He later discovers that he was the victim of a traffic accident, with his survival beneficial to Doress's experimentations.
As a Baoh, Ikuro displays other abilities.  allows him to secrete corrosive enzymes from his hands, melting through metal and human flesh.  produces two blades coming out of his arms that can slice through nearly anything.  turns Baoh's hair into needle-like projectiles that burst into flames upon contact. The only way to kill a Baoh is to kill the worm, by removing it from the brain by force and then burning it alive. A Baoh will also die after 111 days of the worm living in its brain, after which its larvae leave and kill the host, seeking out hosts of their own. A Baoh can also be put into dormancy by submerging the host in salt water.

A 9-year-old girl possessing psychic abilities, including automatic writing, table-turning, and precognition. She is also a captive of Doress, as they wish to exploit her psychic abilities. She keeps another of Doress's experiments, a brand new marsupial-like lifeform she has named  as a pet.

Doress
The  created Baoh and seeks to kill Ikuro before the virus can spread.

Doress's main scientist who is responsible for the creation of the Baoh parasite. Perhaps the ultimate irony, which Professor Kasuminome himself voices near the end of the OVA, is that he succeeded far too well. His intent was to create the ultimate soldier, a weapon of such power no one could possibly defeat it, but in doing so he created Baoh—a weapon no one, including Doress or Kasuminome himself, could ever possibly control or contain. Hirohiko Araki named him after the  neighborhood of Wakabayashi-ku, Sendai.

Kasuminome's assistant. She is first seen chasing Sumire when she escapes in the first chapter.

One of Doress's assassins sent to kill Ikuro Hashizawa and recapture Sumire. He unwittingly sparks Ikuro's Baoh Armed Phenomenon transformation and is killed.

Doress's top assassin, said to be able to blow someone's brains out with a single sniper shot. During the fight with Ikuro, it is revealed that Dordo is actually a cyborg.

He sees Baoh as a worthy opponent and carves a sigil into his chest, claiming that he will kill Baoh. Baoh, however, gains the upper hand by flinging his sabers off at him, removing his power dampening bandana, only for Walken to seek vengeance. Hirohiko Araki named Walken after American actor Christopher Walken.

Cast

Staff

English localization

Licensing
The manga was licensed in English and released in monthly chapters by Viz Media in 1990; sales were pitiful, and it was not until 1995 that they released it in graphic novel format. The OVA was licensed for an English DVD release by AnimEigo in 2000 and was released in 2001.

Other appearances
The series' main protagonist, Ikuro Hashizawa, was released on 14 November 2013 as a downloadable playable character in JoJo's Bizarre Adventure: All Star Battle in his Baoh form. In the 2022 remaster JoJo's Bizarre Adventure: All Star Battle R he is included in the initial roster.

Reception
Hiroyuki Takei, author of the manga Shaman King, said it was one of his favorite series along with JoJo's Bizarre Adventure in his youth.

References

External links
Baoh at AnimEigo

OAV review by Anime News Network
OAV review by Mania.com

Action anime and manga
Biopunk anime and manga
Horror anime and manga
Pierrot (company)
Shōnen manga
Shueisha franchises
Shueisha manga
Superheroes in anime and manga
Viz Media manga